Ronald Montagu Burrows (16 August 1867 – 14 May 1920) was a British archaeologist and academic, who served as Principal of King's College London from 1913 to 1920.

Biography
He was born on 16 August 1867 in Rugby, Warwickshire, England, the son of the Rev. Leonard Francis Burrows, a master at Rugby School, and his wife Mary Vicars. He was educated at Charterhouse School. and matriculated at Christ Church, Oxford in 1886, graduating in Greats in 1890.

Burrows began his academic career as assistant to Gilbert Murray, Professor of Greek at the University of Glasgow from 1891 to 1897. Burrows was then appointed Professor of Greek at University College, Cardiff, where he taught from 1898 until 1908. He was Hulme Professor of Greek at the University of Manchester between 1908 and 1913. In 1913, he was appointed Principal of King's College London, a post he held until his death in 1920. His time there was marked by the foundation of the Koreas Chair. 

Burrows was also involved in bringing Greece into the First World War as a political and military ally of the United Kingdom. He was a strong, uncritical supporter of Eleftherios Venizelos.

Works
Burrows was a noted archaeologist who carried out excavations in Greece at Pílos (ancient Pylos, on the Coryphasium promontory) and the nearby island of Sfaktiría. This work helped to establish studies of the Minoan civilization. With Percy and Annie Ure, he undertook major excavations at Rhitsona in Boeotia.

References

Bibliography
George Glasgow, Ronald Burrows: a memoir. London, 1924.

External links

Encyclopædia Britannica Article
Collected papers of Ronald M. Burrows
  (under multiple adjacent headings)

1867 births
1920 deaths
People educated at Charterhouse School
Alumni of Christ Church, Oxford
Academics of Cardiff University
Academics of the Victoria University of Manchester
Principals of King's College London
Fellows of King's College London
British historians
British archaeologists
Scholars of ancient Greek pottery
British Christian socialists